Valerie M. Hudson (born 1958) is an American professor of political science in the Department of International Affairs at The Bush School of Government and Public Service at Texas A&M University as of January 2012.  Prior to coming to Texas A&M, Hudson was a professor of political science at Brigham Young University for over 24 years. She is most noted for having co-authored the book Bare Branches which discussed the effects of China's demographic decisions on sex ratios in China and other countries.

Hudson's early life and education;

Hudson was born in Washington D.C in the year 1958.She joined The Church of Jesus Christ of Latter-day Saints (also commonly known as Mormons) in 1971. She had been a Roman Catholic.  Hudson received her bachelor's degree from Brigham Young University (BYU), and her master's and Ph.D. from Ohio State University.

While a doctoral candidate, Hudson taught for three years at Otterbein College, and after receiving her Ph.D., she was a visiting professor at Northwestern University and then Rutgers University. In 1987 she joined the faculty of BYU.  Hudson served as associate director of the David M. Kennedy Center for International Studies for eight years. In that capacity, she directed the graduate program.

In April 2019, she was named a University Distinguished Professor at the Texas A&M University, the university's highest faculty honor.

Personal
Hudson is married to artist David Cassler, a painter with an MFA from BYU. They are the parents of eight children, three of whom have cystic fibrosis.

Writings
Hudson's research foci include foreign policy analysis, national security policy, social science methodology, and gender in International Relations.  She has also published Mormon-related writings, particularly on the topic of Mormon doctrine concerning women.
Hudson has written or edited several books, including Foreign Policy Analysis: Classical and Contemporary Theory (Boulder, Colorado: Rowman and Littlefield, 2007, 2013, 2019), Culture and Foreign Policy, Artificial Intelligence and International Politics as well as Bare Branches: Security Implications of Asia's Surplus Male Populations (MIT Press, 2004).  The last was with Andrea Den Boer. In April 2012 Columbia University Press published a book co-authored by Hudson entitled Sex and World Peace. Recent co-authored books also include (with Patricia Leidl) The Hillary Doctrine: Sex and American Foreign Policy (Columbia University Press, 2015).

Hudson has edited multiple books with Kerry M. Kartchner on Latter-day Saints and their relationships with United States foreign and security policies. Hudson wrote a long article with Sorensen on Latter-day Saint views of Womanist theology published in David L. Paulsen's and Donald W. Musser's Mormonism in Dialogue with Contemporary Christianity (Macon, Georgia: Mercer University Press, 2007). She contributed a collaborative article with Alan J. Hawkins, Camille Fronk Olson, Lynn D. Wardle, Richard D. Draper, Diane L. Spangler and a few others, an article about mothers and fathers being equal partners in David C. Dollahite's Strengthening Our Families: An In-depth Look At The Proclamation on The Family.  With A. Don Sorensen and Allen Bergin Hudson wrote an article entitled "Benevolent Power and Unrighteous Dominion" that was published in Bergin's Eternal Values and Personal Growth: LDS and Social Sciences Perspectives (Provo: BYU Press, 2002). She has also written Women in Eternity, Women of Zion with A. Don Sorensen (Springville: Cedar Fort, 2004).

Hudson has published articles in such journals as International Security and Political Psychology including article co-authored with others such as Bonnie Ballif-Spanvill about the relationship between the security of women and the security of states.  She also contributed a chapter to Foreign Policy Decision Making (Revisited). Additionally, she and fellow researcher Hillary Matfess uncovered linkages between violent conflict and bride price.

Recent work
Hudson was one of the founders of the on-line journal Square Two, which is a forum for scholarly articles on important issues of the world today as informed by a Church of Jesus Christ and Latter-day Saints' perspective.  She is also a principal investigator of the WomanStats Project, which began in 2001.

Hudson is a self-described feminist. She has been influenced by the writings of Alma Don Sorensen on equality and Sylviane Agacinski on parity between men and women.

Notes

References
Amazon blurb on Women in Zion
bio of David Cassler

Deseret News March 9, 2010
July 3, 2004 New York Times article on Hudson and her book
Hudson's vita
Deseret News, June 15, 2009
MIT Press bio
WomanStats project webpage

1958 births
Converts to Mormonism from Roman Catholicism
Latter Day Saints from Texas
American women political scientists
American political scientists
Brigham Young University alumni
Brigham Young University faculty
Living people
Northwestern University faculty
Otterbein University faculty
People from Utah County, Utah
People from Washington, D.C.
Rutgers University faculty
Fulbright Distinguished Chairs
Latter Day Saints from Washington, D.C.
Latter Day Saints from Ohio
Latter Day Saints from Utah